L'angelo bianco (internationally released as The White Angel) is a 1955 Italian melodrama film directed by  Raffaello Matarazzo. It is the sequel of Nobody's Children (1951). According to the author Louis Bayman, this couple of films "sealed director Raffaello Matarazzo's reputation as king of the Italian melodramatists".

The film's sets were designed by the art director Ottavio Scotti.

Cast
Amedeo Nazzari as  Guido Carani
Yvonne Sanson as Lina Marcolin / Luisa Fanti 
Enrico Olivieri as Bruno Carani
Enrica Dyrell as Elena Carani
Alberto Farnese as Poldo
Flora Lillo as Flora
Philippe Hersent as Mario La Torre
Nerio Bernardi as avvocato Rossi
Virgilio Riento as dottor Marini
Olga Solbelli as madre superiora
Ignazio Balsamo as poliziotto
Franca Parisi as cameriera 
Emilio Cigoli as direttore della prigione
Rina Franchetti as prigioniera
Silvana Jachino as prigioniera 
Paola Quattrini as Anna Carani

References

External links

1955 films
1955 drama films
Films directed by Raffaello Matarazzo
Italian drama films
1950s Italian-language films
Italian sequel films
Melodrama films
Italian black-and-white films
1950s Italian films